Christiane Gohl (born 1958) is a German author who uses the pen names Ricarda Jordan, Sarah Lark and Elisabeth Rotenberg. In addition to writing children's books centered on horses, she is also a novelist.

Biography
Born in Bochum, Gohl studied history and literature. Working as a travel guide, she discovered New Zealand where she took an immediate liking to the people and the scenery. Using the pen name Sarah Lark, several of her novels are set in New Zealand while she uses Ricarda Jordan as her pen name for her historical novels. Gohl has also worked as an elementary school teacher and a commercial writer.

She became interested in horses at the age of 10 and now shows special concern for the art of riding and the care and treatment of horses. Several of her novels and non-fiction works on horses have become best sellers. Christiane Gohl now lives on a farm near Almería in the south of Spain where she not only writes but also cares for retired horses.

Selected works

Christiane Gohl 
 Ein Pflegepferd für Julia. Kosmos, 1993, .
 Julia und das weiße Pony. Kosmos, 1993, .
 Julia und der Hengst aus Spanien. Kosmos, 1993, .
 Julias erster Wanderritt. Kosmos, 1994, .
 Julia und das Springpferd. Kosmos, 1995, .
 Ein Traumpferd für Julia. Kosmos, 1996, .
 Julia und ihr Fohlen. Kosmos, 1996, .
 Julia – Aufregung im Reitverein. Kosmos, 1997, .
 Julia – Ferienjob mit Islandpferden. 2002, .
 Julia und der Dressurstar. Kosmos, 1998, .
 Julia – Neue Pferde, neue Freunde. Kosmos, 1998, .
 Julia – Ein Pferd für zwei. Kosmos, 1999, .
 Julia und der Pferdeflüsterer. Kosmos, 1999, .
 Julia – Reitbeteiligung gesucht. Kosmos, 2000, .
 Julia und die Nachtreiter. Kosmos, 2000, .
 Julia und das Reitturnier. Kosmos, 2001, .
 Julia – Eifersucht im Reitstall. Kosmos, 2001, .
 Julia – Ferien im Sattel. Kosmos, 2002, .
 Julia – Reiterglück mit Hindernissen. 2005, .
 Julia am Ziel ihrer Träume. 2006, .
 Ein Pony für uns beide. 2009, .
 Freizeitpferde selber schulen. Jungpferde erziehen, ausbilden, anreiten. Kosmos, 1997, .
 Lea und die Pferde – Das Glück der Erde... Boje Verlag, 2011, .
 Lea und die Pferde – Pferdefrühling. Boje Verlag, 2011, .
 Lea und die Pferde – Das Traumpferd fürs Leben. Boje Verlag, 2011, .
 Lea und die Pferde – Herzklopfen und Reiterglück. Boje Verlag, 2011, .
 Lea und die Pferde – Ein Joker für alle Fälle. Boje Verlag, 2011, .
 Lea und die Pferde – Sommer im Sattel. Boje Verlag, 2011, .
 Lea und die Pferde – Reitfieber. Boje Verlag, 2011, .
 Lea und die Pferde – Stallgeflüster. Boje Verlag, 2011, .
 Lea und die Pferde – Pferde, Sonne, Ferienglück. Boje Verlag, 2011, .
 Lea und die Pferde – Ein Herz für Joker. Boje Verlag, 2011, .

Elisabeth Rotenberg 
 Von Ponys und Pferden. Oetinger-Verlag, 1998, .
 Vom Reiten und Voltigieren. Oetinger-Verlag, 1999, .

Sarah Lark 
 Neuseelandsaga
 Im Land der weißen Wolke. Bastei-Lübbe, 2007, translated as In the Land of the Long White Cloud.
 Das Lied der Maori. Bastei-Lübbe, 2008, translated as Song of the Spirits.
 Der Ruf des Kiwis. Bastei Lübbe, 2009, translated as Call of the Kiwi.

 Kauri-Trilogie
 Das Gold der Maori. Bastei Lübbe, 2010, .
 Im Schatten des Kauribaums. Bastei Lübbe, 2011, .
 Die Tränen der Maori-Göttin. Bastei Lübbe, 2012, .

 Neuseelandsaga II
 Die Zeit der Feuerblüten. Bastei Lübbe, 2013,  (Erster Band der neuen Serie über die Auswandererin Ida)
 Der Klang des Muschelhorns. Bastei Lübbe, 2013,  (Zweiter Band der neuen Serie über die Auswandererin Ida)

 Jamaikasaga
 Die Insel der tausend Quellen. Bastei Lübbe, 2011, .
 Die Insel der roten Mangroven. Bastei Lübbe, 2012, .

 Weitere Werke
 Ruf der Dämmerung. Bastei Lübbe, 2012,  (Jugendbuch)

Ricarda Jordan 
 Die Pestärztin. Bastei-Lübbe, 2009, .
 Der Eid der Kreuzritterin. Bastei-Lübbe, 2010, .
 Das Geheimnis der Pilgerin. Bastei-Lübbe, 2011, .
 Das Erbe der Pilgerin. Bastei-Lübbe, 2012, .
 Die Geisel des Löwen. Bastei-Lübbe, 2013, .
 Tochter der Elbe. Bastei-Lübbe, 2014, .

References

1958 births
Living people
People from Bochum
21st-century German novelists
21st-century German women writers
German children's writers
German women novelists
Pony books
21st-century pseudonymous writers
Pseudonymous women writers